Waste is unwanted or undesired material.

Waste, WASTE or W.A.S.T.E. may also refer to:

Arts, entertainment, and media

Music

Groups and organizations
W.A.S.T.E., the official merchandise store and newsletter for Radiohead and affiliated projects 
W.A.S.T.E. (band), an American band

Songs
 "Waste", a song by Lily Allen from No Shame
 "Waste", a song from the album Billy Breathes by the rock band Phish
 "Waste", a song by Seether from Finding Beauty in Negative Spaces
 "Waste", a song by Staind from Break the Cycle
 "Waste", a song by Brockhampton from Saturation
 "Waste", a song by Dove Cameron
 "Waste", a song by KMFDM from Symbols
 "Waste", a song by Smash Mouth from Astro Lounge

Other arts, entertainment, and media
Waste (play), a 1906 play by Harley Granville-Barker
W.A.S.T.E. (We Await Silent Tristero's Empire), the underground postal service in Thomas Pynchon's 1966 novel The Crying of Lot 49
The Wasting, a 2017 movie

Computing
WASTE, a piece of software for establishing friend-to-friend (dark P2P) file sharing networks
WASTE text engine, a multilingual text-handling library for the Mac OS

Other uses

Waste (law), a legal term concerning property
Metabolic waste, any unwanted substances that are expelled from living organisms
Waste of energy: the opposite of environmental energy conservation
Waste types
Waste heat

See also
Road apple (disambiguation), a term for animal feces, often on a road and/or from a horse
Muda (Japanese term), a Japanese term for "waste", as used in lean manufacturing and agile software development
Waist (disambiguation)
Wasted (disambiguation)
Wasteland (disambiguation)
Wasting, the process by which a debilitating disease causes muscle and fat tissue to waste away
Wasting Time (disambiguation)